Mervyn Niall Wingfield (3 September 1935- 25 July 2015) was the 10th Viscount Powerscourt, and also Baron Powerscourt, of Powerscourt in the County of Wicklow, in the Peerage of the United Kingdom, succeeding his father April 3, 1973.  He died in 2015 in Thailand.

Biography 
Mervyn Niall Wingfield was born 3 September 1935, son of Mervyn Patrick Wingfield, 9th Viscount Powerscourt (1905-73) and the former Sheila Claude Beddington. He succeeded his father in the family honours, 3 April 1973. The Powerscourt barony (1886) gave him an automatic seat in the House of Lords until the passing of the House of Lords Act 1999, but according to Hansard he never spoke from the floor of the House.

He married Wendy Anne Pauline Slazenger, daughter of Ralph C.G. Slazenger (heir to the Slazenger sporting goods company) on 15 September 1962, a year after the 9th Viscount had sold the family's Powerscourt Estate to the senior Slazenger. They were divorced in 1974. On 15 March 1978, he married Pauline Vann, a Californian; they were divorced in 1995. He had two children from his first marriage, Julia Wingfield (born 5 Aug 1965), and a son, Mervyn Anthony Wingfield, 11th Viscount Powerscourt (born 21 August 1963).

He died in Thailand, where he had been living for some time, on 25 July 2015.

References 

Viscounts in the Peerage of Ireland
1935 births
2015 deaths
Barons in the Peerage of the United Kingdom
Powerscourt